Further Adventures of Cyclops and Phoenix is a four-issue comic book mini-series published in 1996 by Marvel Comics.

Publication history
The series is a sequel to the Adventures of Cyclops and Phoenix (1994), and was written by Peter Milligan with pencils by John Paul Leon and inks by Klaus Janson.

Plot summary
The X-Men members Cyclops and Phoenix are brought to Victorian era England in the year 1859, where the scientist Nathaniel Essex, obsessed with Darwin's theory of evolution, encounters the centuries-old mutant Apocalypse who transforms him into Mister Sinister.

Collected editions
A trade paperback was produced some time after the mini-series finished publication collecting it into one 96 page volume released in October 1997. However, it was produced during a period of economic decline for Marvel, and before trades had reached the popularity they would a few years later, and has thus been left out of print.

Cyclops & Phoenix series
In the year of 2018, both miniseries were collected into a single paperback.

In other media

Television
The episode "Descent" of X-Men: The Animated Series details the origin of Mister Sinister and is loosely based on Further Adventures of Cyclops and Phoenix miniseries.

Notes

References

Comics by Peter Milligan
Comics about time travel